Edward Augustus Conger (January 7, 1882 – August 7, 1963) was a United States district judge of the United States District Court for the Southern District of New York.

Education and career

Born on January 7, 1882, in Poughkeepsie, New York, Conger attend New York University School of Law and read law in 1904. He was an assistant district attorney of Dutchess County, New York from 1908 to 1913. He was the District Attorney of Dutchess County from 1913 to 1915. He was a Judge of the Poughkeepsie City Court from 1915 to 1919. He was in private practice in Poughkeepsie from 1919 to 1938.

Federal judicial service

Conger was nominated by President Franklin D. Roosevelt on June 10, 1938, to the United States District Court for the Southern District of New York, to a new seat authorized by 52 Stat. 584. He was confirmed by the United States Senate on June 16, 1938, and received his commission on June 24, 1938. He assumed senior status on October 20, 1954. His service terminated on August 7, 1963, due to his death in Poughkeepsie.

References

Sources

 

Judges of the United States District Court for the Southern District of New York
United States district court judges appointed by Franklin D. Roosevelt
20th-century American judges
New York University School of Law alumni
New York (state) lawyers
1882 births
1963 deaths
United States federal judges admitted to the practice of law by reading law